Habonim Dror ("the builders–freedom") is the evolution of two Jewish Labour Zionist youth movements that merged in 1982.

Habonim ("the builders") was founded in 1929 in the United Kingdom and over a period of years, spread to all English-speaking countries. Each country developed its own independent version of the original movement whilst sharing the core ideology of being a Jewish Zionist-socialist cultural youth movement.

Dror ("freedom") was founded in Poland in 1915 out of a wing of the Tze'irei Tziyon (Zion Youth) study circle. The majority of Tze'irei Tziyon had merged with a group called Hashomer in 1913 to form Hashomer Hatzair, and those who remained outside of the new group formed Dror. The group was influenced by the teachings of the Russian Narodniks.

Members of Dror participated in the Warsaw Ghetto uprising. Mordechaj Tenenbaum and other Dror members organised two underground factions in the Bialystok Ghetto.

Dror was aligned with the HaKibbutz Hameuhad network, while Habonim was aligned with the Ichud kibbutzim. When the two kibbutz movements merged in 1980 to form the United Kibbutz Movement (TaKa"M), so did their respective youth movements.

Ideology
Habonim Dror is a Jewish cultural youth movement, which exists to connect young Jews via Jewish culture, both within Israel and in the Jewish Diaspora. One of the central ideas is that of tikkun olam, a Hebrew phrase that means "mending the world" which originated in the early rabbinic period of Judaism. The Movement ideology falls into different categories. They are Judaism and Chalutziut (Pioneering), specifically Aliyah (moving to Israel, and more specifically to Kibbutz), collective action and mutual support that falls under the rubric of socialist ideology, and AliHagshama Atzmit (Self-realisation). These categories are not independent ideologies, each element integrates with others others. Every chaver(a) (member) tends to embody the spirit of Habonim Dror and the underlying idea of mutual acceptance and support for one another through good works, based on their shared experiences and values gained in the movement. Habonim Dror's ideology is an attempt to represent this forward direction.

The expression of these ideals involves gatherings and activities that include scouting, camping, hiking, as well as the education of the geography and history of Eretz Yisrael (the land of Israel). Jewish history is given attention, as are songs and dances taken from the pioneer days of the present State. Socialist ideals are expresed through interest in kibbutz and "irbutz" (urban communal living spaces movements) living.

The three pillars 
Habonim-Dror is based on three so-called "pillars": Judaism, Zionism, and socialism. Judaism is mentioned first because this is a "Jewish" movement interested in the upbuilding of Israeli through collective/collaborative work.

Judaism 
On every Friday at sunset, the Sabbath is greeted with song. At the end of the Sabbath, the Havdalah is said. Religious symbols are present during the Sabbath and the Israeli flag is visible at activities. The wearing of a head covering or Kippah not required.  Additionally, Kashrut is not always adhered to

When the movement began in London there were only two "pillars", namely Judaism and Scouting. As the ideology developed, Zionism was added along with Socialism. The latter two were connected through the desire to experiment with kibbutz life. The history of the movement was written and published in 1999 in a book "Habonim in Britain 1928-1955".

Zionism 
Habonim is historically a Zionist youth movement. Zionism ( supporting the creation of a state for Jews) is one of the principles of Habonim. Many of the educational programs offered by Habonim during activities are the history of the Jews and desire for a homeland, and then how collaborative work sets the stage for community and the ability to create a homeland supported by tikun olam and creating a vibrant and rich living experience. In the 1960s, 1970s and 1980s many members went on Aliyah.  Today, Habonim remains suppportive of state welcoming of Jews and is positive towards Israel. But Habonim distances itself from supporting the ideas and activities that support West Bank settlements and Habonim expresses the desire that Israeli and Arabs learn to collaborate and create a peaceful existence that honors both ethnicities, among others.

Socialism
Habonim has always had at its core, the idea that socialist ideals can be beneficial to jews and Arabs alike. The main principles of equality and sharing are very prominent in the movement. Everyone is treated as equal to each other (of course there is a divide between chanichim and madrichim).  Facilities are generally shared, resulting in realization of a collaborative ideal. The unity and equality in Habonim can also be seen in the "mifkad (מפקד) or the roll call held every morning (excluding the sabbath). At the mifkad the program of the day is presented and two songs are sung. The two songs are:

 Od Lo Gamarnu (עוד לא גמרנו) 
 hatikva (התקווה)

During the singing of these songs the flags of Habonim and the Israeli flag are raised.

Origins in the United Kingdom
Quoting the official history of Habonim Great Britain, "a certain mystique surrounded the question of who founded the Habonim Movement but there is little doubt that the major personality behind the idea was Wellesley Aron". Aron acknowledges that he could not have succeeded without Chaim Lipshitz, who organized the first model Gedud (group), and Norman Lourie, whose enthusiasm helped generate other volunteer leaders. Lourie went on to found Habonim South Africa. Encouraged by them, Aron wrote the outline for the first Handbook and by April 1929 their organization was given the name Habonim. This was followed the next month, May 1929, by the first group, "Gedud Trumpeldor" led by Lipschitz. This date is acknowledged as the official founding date of Habonim.

According to Aron, he modeled Habonim after Baden-Powell's Boy Scouts.  The idea soon spread to other English-speaking countries and ex-colonies where Jews resided. In 1930, Norman Lourie founded Habonim Southern Africa, with the first camp taking place at Parys in 1931. Initially the idea was a "Jewish Youth Cultural Movement" for children aged between 12 and 18. Unlike other organizations in other countries, the movement was initially intended to be of a non-Zionist (non-political) kind.

Early history
Lipschitz was the natural person to lead the first group since he had already organized meetings of boys at his father's Cheder (school room) and they were well established by December 1928. (Incidentally this Cheder was one of the few more-progressive of these establishments, many were unattractive places that taught only traditional Hebrew and Torah (Biblical law).) The new group was where Chaim taught Modern Hebrew along with songs and dances of the Jewish settlers in Palestine, Jewish history and various games. Chaim was assisted by Norman Lourie, a visitor from South Africa who had previously visited Palestine. The aim of these group meetings was to attract and better educate the Jewish children of immigrants from Poland and Russia (mostly pre 1905, when immigration to the U.K. was severely limited), about their Jewish history and about the progress of the Jews presently living in Palestine. These children had somewhat dismal lives in the slums of the East-End, (Stepney and Whitechapel) which were not lightened by the mostly poor Cheder education system then available.

Official founding
The first meeting of leaders of the Jewish youth community as reported by Wellesley Aron, was in a letter to Dr. S. Brodetsky (of the Zionist Foundation) on 11 January 1929. Wellesley mentioned that only 5 people attended, but that Norman Lourie (the third founder) called a larger meeting for the following week (10 January) where representatives from at least 7 Jewish youth organizations were present. This meeting was in London at 77 Great Russel Street EC1. England at this time was the center of political Zionism, after the Balfour Declaration in 1917 had stated that "His Majesty's Government favourably viewed the establishment of a Jewish National Home in Palestine" (then under British mandate).

The new youth movement Habonim (The Builders) was deliberately non-Zionist in ideology. The first Gedud Trumpeldor was built on Lipschitz's existing youth group in Stepney with Lipshitz as Rosh (leader) assisted by Norman Lourie. In May 1929 the first 27-page hand-booklet detailing how Habonim was to function was published by Aron with help in the mimeographing from Norman Lourie and his friend Nadia, who he later married.

They both returned to Norman's home country South Africa in 1930, to establish Habonim branches in various towns and countries in that continent and in India.

Habonim UK & Ireland 1929–1955

The Movement grew very rapidly. In London alone there were 21 groups by 1932. The Movement had at least 2,500 members by the time of their ten-year "Jamboree Camp" in 1939. The various gedudim or groups were initially single sex (like the Scouting Movement) but were soon were changed for boys and girls together. Associated but not part of the Movement were training farms, called Hachshara farms, for the older members to learn about agriculture and life on kibbutz, to which their aliyah (or "going-up" to Eretz Yisrael) would eventually lead.

During the Second World War the senior members of Habonim helped to organize and take care of the many refugee children who escaped from the Nazis through special Kindertransports.  Their parents had agreed to this tragic life-time separation, which was arranged through some of the more future-minded Jewish organizations remaining in Europe. Other members whose aliyah was delayed due to the war, helped the war-time food shortage to be met by working as groups of laborers on various farming communities.

Graduates of British Habonim contributed significant manpower to the establishment of many kibbutzim in Israel, among others, Kfar Blum, Kfar Hanasi, Gesher Haziv, Beit HaEmek, Mevo Hama, Tuval and Amiad of these the most British is Kfar Hanassi.

Graduates
Graduates of the two movements include:

Howie B
David Baddiel
Ron Bloom
Sacha Baron Cohen
Jason Feddy
Leonard Fein
Stanley Fischer
Jonathan Freedland
Ira Glass
J.J. Goldberg
Chaim Herzog
Tony Judt
Mike Leigh
Jack Markell
Golda Meir
Aaron Naparstek
Michael Oren
Dan Patterson and Mark Leveson (producers of Whose Line Is It Anyway?)Robert Popper
David Rakoff
Mark Regev
Mordechai Richler
Seth Rogen
Guy Spigelman
Toba Spitzer
David Twersky
Jaques Wagner
Arnold Wesker

Today
Today, Habonim Dror exists in seventeen countries worldwide. Habonim Dror′s sister movement in Israel is HaNoar HaOved VeHaLomed.

Habonim Dror has also adopted gender-inclusive programming for its campers as per the Jewish principle of ‘shivyon erech ha’adam’ (equality of human value). Above providing gender-neutral washrooms, the movement's summer camps have reconfigured portions of the highly-gendered Hebrew language used on its campgrounds to affirm transgender and non-binary members. Rather than refer to campers as "chanich" (singular masculine) or "chanicha" (singular feminine), the word "chanichol" has been constructed to speak provide a gender-neutral option for a single camper, and "chanichimot" for a gender-neutral group of campers instead of "chanichim", the plural masculine version. These changes have also been carried out for camp counsellors, originally called "madrich" (singular masculine), "madricha" (singular feminine), "madrichim" (plural masculine) or "madrichot" (plural feminine) now replaced with "madrichol" (singular gender-neutral) and "madrichimot" (plural gender-neutral).

Countries in which Habonim Dror operates

Habonim Dror operates in Aotearoa New Zealand, Argentina, Australia, Belgium, Brazil, Canada, France, Germany, Hungary, Mexico, the Netherlands, South Africa, the United Kingdom, the United States and Uruguay.

New Zealand
Habonim Dror Aotearoa New Zealand (HDANZ) has 3 main centres; Auckland being the largest, then Wellington and Christchurch. Each Ken runs weekly meetings. The movement come together for various seminars during the year as well as winter and summer camps. The summer camps run for ten days and are always in tents and on a farm. Habonim Dror Aotearoa New Zealand is possibly the last Jewish youth movement in the world to run their summer camps entirely under canvas, including digging own toilets. Winter camps are shorter and are held in cabins due to Aotearoa New Zealand's climate. Habo ANZ celebrated its 70th anniversary in 2018. Habonim Dror Aotearoa New Zealand is a member of the Australasian Zionist Youth Council (AZYC).

 Australia (HDOZ) 
Habonim Dror, a.k.a. Habo, has four kenim (branches) around Australia. They are in Sydney, Melbourne, Perth and Ken Ha'Shemesh Ha'Olah, which runs online and branches out to smaller communities around the country. Habonim Dror Australia runs weekly meetings for students from years three to twelve as well as biannual camps. Each state runs independent winter camps and a summer camp for junior students (years three to eight), while annually in January all state movements come together for a federal camp (FEDCAMP) for years nine to twelve, which runs for ten days. Habonim Dror Australia is a member of the Australasian Zionist Youth Council (AZYC).

Every year chanichim (members) who have just finished high school travel to Israel for a year on Shnat Hachshara Ve'Hadracha le'Aliyah (Hebrew: שנת הכשרה והדרכה לעלייה, lit. "year of preparation and guidance for Aliya"), commonly shortened to Shnat ("year of"), where they go on an extensive experiential and educational process and actively carry out movement aims and engage with Israeli society.

 History 
Habonim was first brought to Australia in 1940, when seven new Australians decided to create a Zionist youth movement along similar lines to those that already existed in Europe. In March of that year the first meeting was held in Melbourne's Herzl Hall, and later in December, Habonim's first summer camp.

After a brief union with Betar in 1942, Habonim grew into an Australia-wide movement in May 1944. The following year, Habonim Australia's first hachshara (preparation, in Hebrew: הכשרה) farm was established in Springvale, about 25 km out of Melbourne's centre. The next year five Habonim graduates made aliyah settling on Kibbutz Kfar Blum.

In 1957, the first organised group of Habonim graduates made aliyah in a garin to Kibbutz Yizre'el. Six garinim would ultimately be formed with the intention of making aliyah. It is unclear how many succeeded.

In recent years, there has been a new drive of garin aliyah from HDOZ, with Garinim settling in Haifa, Tiberias and Tel Aviv. Garinim such as Ayalah (Shnat 2012), Mafteach (Shnat 2013) and Emesh (2014) have all renewed chalutzik aliyah from HDOZ.

 Movement structure 
At an Australia-wide level (federal), there is an executive secretariat (mazkirut, in Hebrew: מזכירות) which includes a Secretary-General (mazkir, in Hebrew: מזכיר), Treasurer (gizbar, in Hebrew: גיזבר), a Head of Education (rosh chinuch, in Hebrew: ראש חינוך) and a Shnat co-ordinator ("rakaz shnat", in Hebrew: רכז שנת). Each individual branch has a mazkir, gizbar and rosh chinuch executive position, along with an external community liaison ("meta'em", in Hebrew: מתאם) and an additional position for a representative from the year level returning from shnat.

Each shichvah (year level) has a tzevet (team) of madrichim (leaders) responsible for their educational process and general wellbeing. These madrichim will prepare and run peulot (activities) on a weekly basis for their chanichim, as well as biannual camps and other extra events such as shabbatonim (sleepover on shabbat). Tzvatim are made up of bogrim (madrichim who have returned from shnat) and madatzim (year 11 chanichim). Senior tzvatim are made up solely of bogrim, while junior tzvatim are primarily madatzim leading alongside bogrim who help guide them through their first year of leading. There is also a tzevet that is responsible for running peulot for bogrim themselves, ensuring that there is a continued educational process among the educators.

Additionally, there are other tafkidim (roles) that allow for madrichim to take responsibility for various aspects of the movement such as Judaism, Zionism, gardening, equipment and politics and social action.

Belgium
The Belgian ken is one of the biggest in Europe. Every Saturday afternoon, 130 haverim and madrichim get together in Brussels.

The structure of the movement changes a little each year with every new "tsevet" (team of madrihim between 16 and 18 years old). The roots of this structure are the election of 2 to 4 "mazkirim" (literally "secretaries" in Hebrew, who are the leaders of the madrihim), "vaadot" (literally "committee" in Hebrew, which are small groups of madrihim who are focused on one part of the movement (ex: promotion, events, the koladror (the youth movement's monthly magazine edited, written and published by the madrihim))) and the "shlihim"(literally "messengers" in Hebrew, who are the adults in charge of the movement) 
The mazkirim, elected by the tsevet, are in charge of making sure that everything runs smoothly. They do not have more say or power in the making of decisions or organization of events but they are elected to supervise the ideas, events, and responsibilities of the madrihim, and to keep order during the "yeshivot" (meetings), during the Saturday afternoons, and during the four mahanot (camps) of the year.

Every year, Habonim Dror Belgium organizes 4 mahanot for the haverim. A small one of 5 days at the end of October/ beginning of November where one of the traditions is to celebrate Halloween together and another one is to commemorate Yitzhak Rabin's assassination. One at the end of December/ beginning of January where the haverim, madrihim and shlihim ski together during 8/9 days. Another small mahane, during Pessah, in April, where the haverim love the "droriades" a day inspired by the lag ba'Omer (where the whole day is dedicated to sports games) and other fun activities during 6 days. And one big mahane kaïtz in July which lasts between 14 and 18 days which used to be (until 2019) with the French kenim of Paris and Marseille.

Brazil
The movement arrived in Brazil by influences of the Argentine activists, and began in Porto Alegre, in 1945 and then moved to São Paulo also in 1945. Within a few years, Habonim reached Curitiba and Rio de Janeiro. Some time later, it arrived in Recife, Salvador and Belo Horizonte. And, more recently, it reached Manaus and Fortaleza.

At these nine branches across the country, Habonim runs weekly activities for children, teenagers and young adults from 7 to 22 years old, as well as weekly-long Machanot (camps) in Summer and Winter. Also twice a year is held the National Machaneh.

Once in a two-year cycle, a Veidah Artzit (National Convention) is held, comprising a meeting of all the senior members of the National Movement. The Veidah has powers to modify HD Brazil's ideological platform, as long as it doesn't oppose to the World Movement's principles.

Mexico
The Mexico City ken is one of the most international connected keniano in the world working with North American and Latin America at the same time. Every Saturday afternoon, 10p chaverim and madrichim get together in Mexico City.

The Netherlands

In the 1920s the Joodse jeugdfederatie (Jewish Youth Federation) was founded by Zionist Jewish youngsters. The federation was open to all Jews in the Netherlands and it brought together a large number of young Jews seeking unity and comfort. The Federation supported the creation of a national Jewish home in former Palestine. During the World War II, many members were murdered in The Holocaust. After the war, those who survived and former members came into contact with the in 1928 formed Habonim in the United Kingdom. For 22 years the two movements worked together and this eventually led to the creation of Haboniem beHolland in 1950 (It would not receive official international recognition until 1951). During the following decades Haboniem gathered many followers, many of them Jewish teenagers seeking a way out of their lives with their parent. The purpose of Haboniem beHolland was to help in the building of Israel by supporting the aliyah, the movement of Jews to the Promised Land. The purpose has since changed to educating members about Israel, the Israeli–Palestinian conflict and the history of the Jewish People. In 1958 Haboniem merged with the Kibbutz movement Meyuchad. This led to the merging with the in 1915 formed "dror". In the present day, Haboniem-Dror counts around 300 members of which around 150 are active and pay a contribution. The supporting of aliyah is mostly put aside for educating the Jewish youth on Israel, although it still remains something that some members undertake.

Activities
Haboniem-Dror organizes a number of activities for its members, the most prominent are The five camps and weekends or machanot; "afdelingen", The general members assembly, "Habo Goes" and the "Israelreis".Twice a year, a general members assembly is held. Any member of Haboniem can attend. During the assembly, the progress of the movement is discussed and the financial plans are revealed. During the assembly, any member above 12 years old and who pays contribution can vote and put a motion on the floor. At the summer assembly, a new board is chosen. During some assemblies, the articles of association are changed. The last account of this was the change in 2014.Habo goes are activities that take place outside the clubhouse (not including the machanot). These activities are often in the open air such as a barbecue or a sports day.

Structure
Haboniem has a group-based structure of members. The members who are under 17 years old ( JK7 or lower) are called chanichiem  and the group above 17 years old is called madrichiem. Madrichiem are the leaders of the camp and are responsible for the organization, leading of the JKs, cooking, general entertainment, and the logistics. The main structure of groups is as follows: there are 6 official groups of chanichiem called JKs and from JK6 onwards the naming of groups stops since the members are all madrichiem  by then ( unofficially there is a continuation of count).

North America
Habonim in North America (HDNA) was founded in April 1935 by Young Poale Zion, the youth arm of the Poale Zion Party, at a convention in Buffalo, NY. At its height, the movement had over 2,000 campers attending eleven summer camps throughout the US and Canada. Today, Habonim Dror North America (HDNA) runs many programs during the year, including a biannual veida (a mass meeting with representatives from around the movement), local events in central cities, kibbutzim in Israel, a year-long program in Israel (called Workshop), and many other ideology-focused gatherings. The Movement membership currently exceeds 1,700 youth and has been growing steadily over the past decade.

HDNA also runs six summer camps (called Machanot) across the continent. These have become a large part of the movement and in most cases are more important to members than local meetings (called ken meetings) since they play a key role in involving and recruiting new members to the movement.
The six camps are as follows:
 Camp Galil (Ottsville, Pennsylvania, USA)
 Camp Gesher (Cloyne, Ontario, Canada)
 Camp Gilboa (San Bernardino County, California, USA)
 Camp Miriam (Gabriola Island, British Columbia, Canada)
 Camp Moshava (Maryland) (Street, Maryland, USA)
 Camp Tavor (Three Rivers, Michigan, USA)

Some now defunct camps and Habonim hachshara farms are:
 Camp Amal (Vermont 1948–49, Na'aleh 1950, Cream Ridge 1951, Moshava 1952, Galil 1953)
 Camp Bonim (Dallas, Texas)
 Camp Ein Harod (Ellenville, NY; Originally: Liberty, NY)
 Camp Kinneret (Chelsea, Michigan); later merged with Camp Yad Ari to form Camp Tavor
 Camp Kvutzah Gimli (Gimli, Manitoba)
 Camp Kvutzah Montreal (St. Faustin, Quebec)
 Camp Tel Ari (Hunter, New York)
 Camp Tel Hai (New Buffalo, Michigan)
 Camp Tel Natan (Troy, Missouri)
 Camp Yad Ari (Waupaca, Wisconsin) later merged with Camp Kinneret to form Camp Tavor
 Cream Ridge Farm (Upper Freehold, New Jersey)
 Smithville Farm (Smithville, Ontario)
 Camp Na'aleh (Red Hook, New York; Elizaville, New York; Sidney, New York; Windsor, New York; and other locations)

Additionally, a five-week trip, named Machaneh Bonim in Israel (MBI) is a summer tour of Israel for 16-year-olds (summer after 10th grade). Students from the six camps spend time together and learn about Israel and the movement.

HDNA publishes B'tnua'', the regular movement magazine.

Habonim Dror collaborated with Ameinu, Hashomer Hatzair, and Meretz USA to form the Union of Progressive Zionists campus network, which has now become J Street U, to which Habonim Dror North America only has an affiliation.

Southern Africa
Habonim Dror Southern Africa (HDSA) was founded in 1930 by Norman Lourie. HDSA draws its membership from the Southern African region. However the vast majority of its membership comes from South Africa. HDSA's two primary centres are based in Cape Town and Johannesburg, although the movement is active across the country.

HDSA defines itself as a Jewish Zionist Youth movement (See HDSA Constitution 2009 HDSA classifies itself as a left-wing movement. Unlike other Habonim Dror movements, HDSA does not classify itself as socialist but rather supports economic and social equality.

As a left-wing Zionist movement, HDSA promotes a two-state solution in Israel. It also encourages its members to live in Israel in a manner which positively contributes to Israeli society.

HDSA also places immense value on active citizenship and thus strives to educate its members on South Africa and encourages them to be active in creating a just and equal post apartheid South Africa.

HDSA has changed over the last decades from a movement which had regular weekly meetings and activities that served as a feeder for the annual winter seminars and summer camp. Today, however, for younger people, HDSA has become a summer camp institution whereby most of the participation by chanichim is at summer camp and there is very little if any activity during the rest of the year.

HDSA annually hosts one of the largest summer camps in the Southern Hemisphere at their campsite in Onrus outside Cape Town. During the year, consistent activities are run for its members who range from the ages of 9–23. 
The ideological tenets of the movement such as Zionism, Socialism and Service to Humanity inform many of these activities. 
Additionally, HDSA runs an annual tour to Israel for 16-year-olds and sends many of its members on a ten-month post school program to Israel.

United Kingdom 
Habonim Dror United Kingdom (HDUK) has six kenim (branches) around the United Kingdom. They are in London, Leeds, Glasgow, Manchester, Liverpool and Nottingham. Habonim Dror United Kingdom runs meetings throughout the year as well as a Machaneh and Israel Tour in the Summer.

Habonim Dror has five Machanot, one on a residential site in Wales, where chanichim (participants) will spend time hiking, in education activities, celebrating shabbat and many other activities. Additionally, there is Sayarim Machane which is run in Holland. This Machane is focused on Holocaust education, and is well known for the quality of education and the experience on this Machane.

When chanichim are 16 they go on the Israel Tour, a month trip around Israel, where they are immersed in the culture and history of Israel. In this time, chanichim will travel around Israel, learning about and visiting a variety of sites, they will also be volunteering and spending an entire day with other Habonim Dror tour participants from all over the world.

After returning from Israel Tour, participants become Madrichim (leaders) and will spend the year doing Hadracha (leadership) training in preparation for them to take on roles in the summer across a variety of Machanot.

Every year chanichim who have just finished high school travel to Israel for a year on Shnat Hachshara, commonly referred to as Shnat, where they go on an extensive experiential and educational process and actively carry out movement aims and engage with Israeli society.

References

Further reading

External links

Habonim Dror Aotearoa New Zealand
Habonim Dror North America
Habonim Dror UK

1982 establishments in Israel
Jewish youth organizations
Labor Zionism
Organizations established in 1982
Political organizations based in Israel
Socialism in Israel
Zionist youth movements